The River Kyle is a small river in North Yorkshire, England.

Course

The river is first called Kyle after the confluence of Carle Beck and Derrings Beck. From the confluence it flows south-east of the village of Tholthorpe, near Easingwold, past Flawith, Alne and Tollerton. At Linton-on-Ouse it turns south and joins the River Ouse just north of Newton-on-Ouse. From source to mouth, the river extends to just  in length.

The Kyle is noted for its recurrent problems with pollution caused by agricultural effluent. In 1978, the water from the river became polluted after a barn fire had been extinguished and the water used to douse the fire had found its way into the River Kyle. Some of the pollution was a paraquat based weedkiller which is lethal in high concentrations and for which there is no antidote. As the City of York took its water supply from the River Ouse, they had to close their river intakes for two weeks to allow the polluted water to be flushed downriver.

History
The river previously formed the boundary of the Forest of Galtres. During the Second World War, RAF Bomber Command operated an airfield near the start of the River Kyle at RAF Tholthorpe. Both the Royal Air Force and the Royal Canadian Air Force flew from this base until its closure in 1945. The river also passes close to the current airfield at RAF Linton-on-Ouse, which was originally opened in 1937 as part of RAF Bomber Command.

Etymology
The name of the river derives from the Brittonic *cǖl, meaning "narrow" (Welsh, Cornish and Breton cul). The place-name Alne possibly preserves an earlier alternative name for the river.

Leisure

There are two Ordnance Survey Leisure Walking routes that cross the river near Tollerton.

Lists

Tributaries

 Whitecarr Ings Beck
 New Parks Beck
 Scawsykes Beck
 Shorn Dike

Settlements

 Tholthorpe
 Alne
 Flawith
 Tollerton
 Linton-on-Ouse
 Newton-on-Ouse

Crossings

 Alne Bridge, Alne
 Carrholme Bridge, Near Tollerton
 Linton Bridge, near Newton-on-Ouse

Gallery

Sources

 Ordnance Survey Open Viewer https://www.ordnancesurvey.co.uk/business-government/tools-support/open-data-support
 Google Earth
 National Environment Research Council - Centre for Ecology and Hydrology http://www.ceh.ac.uk/index.html
 Environment Agency http://www.environment-agency.gov.uk/

References

Rivers of North Yorkshire